Doxato (formerly Δοξάτον) is a town and municipality in the Drama regional unit, in East Macedonia and Thrace, Greece. The seat of the municipality is the town Kalampaki.

Municipality
The municipality Doxato was formed at the 2011 local government reform by the merger of the following 2 former municipalities, that became municipal units:
Doxato
Kalampaki

The municipality has an area of 243.400 km2, the municipal unit 162.336 km2. The former municipality of Doxato was founded as a result of law 2539/1997 ("Plan Kapodistria"), by merging the former municipalities of Doxato and Megalou Alexandrou, and the former communities of Agios Athanasios and Kefalarion. According to the 2011 census, the former municipality had a population of 8,943 and the town 2,884.

History (Doxato Massacres)

According to the statistics of Vasil Kanchov ("Macedonia, Ethnography and Statistics"), 900 Greek Christians, 850 Turks, 200 Gypsies, 120 Bulgarian Christians and 120 Vlachs lived in the town in 1900.

Doxato was the scene of two major massacres in recent history.

The first massacre occurred during the Second Balkan War, fought between Greece and Serbia on one hand and Bulgaria on the other. According to Greek sources, on June 30, 1913, a Bulgarian cavalry unit surrounded Doxato and proceeded to massacre between 500 and 600 inhabitants (depending on source), including women and children, burning the town to the ground in the process. However, according to a report by an international commission, organized by the Carnegie endowment, the massacre had been actually committed by local Muslims armed by the Bulgarian army.

The second massacre took place on 29 September 1941 during the Second World War, when Doxato was again (together with the Eastern Macedonia and Thrace) under Bulgarian occupation. During the night of 28–29 September 1941, an insurrection against the Bulgarian occupation troops broke out in nearby Drama by the Communist party of Greece (KKE) and spread to the surrounding country. The local police station in Doxato was attacked, leading to the death of 6-7 Bulgarian policemen. Although those who participated in the insurrection were killed or fled to the mountains, reprisals were harsh. The next day, Bulgarian forces rounded up all the men in town aged 14 and over, and after dividing them into groups of ten, executed them on the night of 29 September 1941. After the revolt, a period of state terror began, involving arrests, house searches and physical violence against citizens.

Distinctions
The Greek government has awarded the town the title of Hero and Martyr City (Ηρωική και Μαρτυρική Πόλη) in recognition for the massacres it has suffered.

Sports
Doxato has two sports clubs, Flilippoi Doxatou, a football club, and AED (a basketball club).

References

External links

Municipalities of Eastern Macedonia and Thrace
Populated places in Drama (regional unit)
Mass murder in 1913
Mass murder in 1941